Hamiltonian optics and Lagrangian optics are two formulations of geometrical optics which share much of the mathematical formalism with Hamiltonian mechanics and Lagrangian mechanics.

Hamilton's principle

In physics, Hamilton's principle states that the evolution of a system  described by  generalized coordinates between two specified states at two specified parameters σA and σB is a stationary point (a point where the variation is zero) of the action functional, or

Condition  is valid if and only if the Euler-Lagrange equations are satisfied, i.e.,

The momentum is defined as

and the Euler–Lagrange equations can then be rewritten as

where .

A different approach to solving this problem consists in defining a Hamiltonian (taking a Legendre transform of the Lagrangian) as

for which a new set of differential equations can be derived by looking at how the total differential of the Lagrangian depends on parameter σ, positions  and their derivatives  relative to σ. This derivation is the same as in Hamiltonian mechanics, only with time t now replaced by a general parameter σ. Those differential equations are the Hamilton's equations

Hamilton's equations are first-order differential equations, while Euler-Lagrange's equations are second-order.

Lagrangian optics

The general results presented above for Hamilton's principle can be applied to optics. In 3D euclidean space the generalized coordinates are now the coordinates of euclidean space.

Fermat's principle

Fermat's principle states that the optical length of the path followed by light between two fixed points, A and B, is a stationary point. It may be a maximum, a minimum, constant or an inflection point. In general, as light travels, it moves in a medium of variable refractive index which is a scalar field of position in space, that is,  in 3D euclidean space. Assuming now that light travels along the x3 axis, the path of a light ray may be parametrized as  starting at a point  and ending at a point . In this case, when compared to Hamilton's principle above, coordinates  and  take the role of the generalized coordinates  while  takes the role of parameter , that is, parameter σ =x3 and N=2.

In the context of calculus of variations this can be written as

The optical path length (OPL) is defined as

where n is the local refractive index as a function of position along the path between points A and B.

The Euler-Lagrange equations
The general results presented above for Hamilton's principle can be applied to optics using the Lagrangian defined in Fermat's principle. The Euler-Lagrange equations with parameter σ =x3 and N=2 applied to Fermat's principle result in

Optical momentum

The optical momentum is defined as

and from the definition of the optical Lagrangian  this expression can be rewritten as

or in vector form

where  is a unit vector and angles α1, α2 and α3 are the angles p makes to axis x1, x2 and x3 respectively, as shown in figure "optical momentum". Therefore, the optical momentum is a vector of norm

where n is the refractive index at which p is calculated. Vector p points in the direction of propagation of light. If light is propagating in a gradient index optic the path of the light ray is curved and vector p is tangent to the light ray.

The expression for the optical path length can also be written as a function of the optical momentum. Having in consideration that  the expression for the optical Lagrangian can be rewritten as

and the expression for the optical path length is

Hamilton's equations

And the corresponding Hamilton's equations with parameter σ =x3 and k=1,2 applied to optics are

Applications

It is assumed that light travels along the x3 axis, in Hamilton's principle above, coordinates  and  take the role of the generalized coordinates  while  takes the role of parameter , that is, parameter σ =x3 and N=2.

Refraction and reflection

If plane x1x2 separates two media of refractive index nA below and nB above it, the refractive index is given by a step function

and from Hamilton's equations

An incoming light ray has momentum pA before refraction (below plane x1x2) and momentum pB after refraction (above plane x1x2). The light ray makes an angle θA with axis x3 (the normal to the refractive surface) before refraction and an angle θB with axis x3 after refraction. Since the p1 and p2 components of the momentum are constant, only p3 changes from p3A to p3B.

which is Snell's law of refraction.

In figure "refraction", the normal to the refractive surface points in the direction of axis x3, and also of vector . A unit normal  to the refractive surface can then be obtained from the momenta of the incoming and outgoing rays by

where i and r are unit vectors in the directions of the incident and refracted rays. Also, the outgoing ray (in the direction of ) is contained in the plane defined by the incoming ray (in the direction of ) and the normal  to the surface.

A similar argument can be used for reflection in deriving the law of specular reflection, only now with nA=nB, resulting in θA=θB. Also, if i and r are unit vectors in the directions of the incident and refracted ray respectively, the corresponding normal to the surface is given by the same expression as for refraction, only with nA=nB

In vector form, if i is a unit vector pointing in the direction of the incident ray and n is the unit normal to the surface, the direction r of the refracted ray is given by:

with

If i⋅n<0 then −n should be used in the calculations. When , light suffers total internal reflection and the expression for the reflected ray is that of reflection:

Rays and wavefronts

From the definition of optical path length 

with k=1,2 where the Euler-Lagrange equations  with k=1,2 were used.

combining the equations for the components of momentum p results in

Since p is a vector tangent to the light rays, surfaces S=Constant must be perpendicular to those light rays. These surfaces are called wavefronts. Figure "rays and wavefronts" illustrates this relationship. Also shown is optical momentum p, tangent to a light ray and perpendicular to the wavefront.

Vector field  is conservative vector field. The gradient theorem can then be applied to the optical path length (as given above) resulting in

and the optical path length S calculated along a curve C between points A and B is a function of only its end points A and B and not the shape of the curve between them. In particular, if the curve is closed, it starts and ends at the same point, or A=B so that

This result may be applied to a closed path ABCDA as in figure "optical path length"

The same is true for segment CD. From these considerations

or

and the optical path length SBC between points B and C along the ray connecting them is the same as the optical path length SAD between points A and D along the ray connecting them. The optical path length is constant between wavefronts.

Phase space

Figure "2D phase space" shows at the top some light rays in a two-dimensional space. Here x2=0 and p2=0 so light travels on the plane x1x3 in directions of increasing x3 values. In this case  and the direction of a light ray is completely specified by the p1 component of momentum  since p2=0. If p1 is given, p3 may be calculated (given the value of the refractive index n) and therefore p1 suffices to determine the direction of the light ray.

For example, ray rC crosses axis x1 at coordinate xB with an optical momentum pC, which has its tip on a circle of radius n centered at position xB. Coordinate xB and the horizontal coordinate p1C of momentum pC completely define ray rC as it crosses axis x1. This ray may then be defined by a point rC=(xB,p1C) in space x1p1 as shown at the bottom of the figure. Space x1p1 is called phase space and different light rays may be represented by different points in this space.

As such, ray rD shown at the top is represented by a point rD in phase space at the bottom. All rays crossing axis x1 at coordinate xB contained between rays rC and rD are represented by a vertical line connecting points rC and rD in phase space. Accordingly, all rays crossing axis x1 at coordinate xA contained between rays rA and rB are represented by a vertical line connecting points rA and rB in phase space. In general, all rays crossing axis x1 between xL and xR are represented by a volume R in phase space. The rays at the boundary ∂R of volume R are called edge rays. For example, at position xA of axis x1, rays rA and rB are the edge rays since all other rays are contained between these two. (A ray parallel to x1 would not be between the two rays, since the momentum is not in-between the two rays)

If p1 and p2 are given, p3 may be calculated (given the value of the refractive index n) and therefore p1 and p2 suffice to determine the direction of the light ray. A ray traveling along axis x3 is then defined by a point (x1,x2) in plane x1x2 and a direction (p1,p2). It may then be defined by a point in four-dimensional phase space x1x2p1p2.

Conservation of etendue

Figure "volume variation" shows a volume V bound by an area A. Over time, if the boundary A moves, the volume of V may vary. In particular, an infinitesimal area dA with outward pointing unit normal n moves with a velocity v.

This leads to a volume variation . Making use of Gauss's theorem, the variation in time of the total volume V volume moving in space is

The rightmost term is a volume integral over the volume V and the middle term is the surface integral over the boundary A of the volume V. Also, v is the velocity with which the points in V are moving.

In optics coordinate  takes the role of time. In general, a large set of rays occupies a large volume  in phase space to which Gauss's theorem may be applied

and using Hamilton's equations

The volume occupied by a set of rays in phase space is called etendue, which is conserved as light rays progress in the optical system along direction x3. This corresponds to Liouville's theorem, which also applies to Hamiltonian mechanics.

Imaging and nonimaging optics

Figure "conservation of etendue" shows on the left a diagrammatic two-dimensional optical system in which x2=0 and p2=0 so light travels on the plane x1x3 in directions of increasing x3 values.

Light rays crossing the input aperture of the optic at point x1=xI are contained between edge rays rA and rB represented by a vertical line between points rA and rB at the phase space of the input aperture (right, bottom corner of the figure). All rays crossing the input aperture are represented in phase space by a region RI.

Also, light rays crossing the output aperture of the optic at point x1=xO are contained between edge rays rA and rB represented by a vertical line between points rA and rB at the phase space of the output aperture (right, top corner of the figure). All rays crossing the output aperture are represented in phase space by a region RO.

Conservation of etendue in the optical system means that the volume (or area in this two-dimensional case) in phase space occupied by RI at the input aperture must be the same as the volume in phase space occupied by RO at the output aperture.

In imaging optics, all light rays crossing the input aperture at x1=xI are redirected by it towards the output aperture at x1=xO where xI=m xO. This ensures that an image of the input is formed at the output with a magnification m. In phase space, this means that vertical lines in the phase space at the input are transformed into vertical lines at the output. That would be the case of vertical line rA rB in RI transformed to vertical line rA rB in RO.

In nonimaging optics, the goal is not to form an image but simply to transfer all light from the input aperture to the output aperture. This is accomplished by transforming the edge rays ∂RI of RI to edge rays ∂RO of RO. This is known as the edge ray principle.

Generalizations

Above it was assumed that light travels along the x3 axis, in Hamilton's principle above, coordinates  and  take the role of the generalized coordinates  while  takes the role of parameter , that is, parameter σ =x3 and N=2. However, different parametrizations of the light rays are possible, as well as the use of generalized coordinates.

General ray parametrization

In this case, when compared to Hamilton's principle above, coordinates ,  and  take the role of the generalized coordinates  with N=3. Applying Hamilton's principle to optics in this case leads to

with k=1,2,3 and where L is the optical Lagrangian. Also in this case the optical momentum is defined as

And the corresponding Hamilton's equations with k=1,2,3 applied optics are

The optical Lagrangian is given by

and does not explicitly depend on parameter σ. For that reason not all solutions of the Euler-Lagrange equations will be possible light rays, since their derivation assumed an explicit dependence of L on σ which does not happen in optics.

The optical momentum components can be obtained from

where . The expression for the Lagrangian can be rewritten as

Comparing this expression for L with that for the Hamiltonian P it can be concluded that

From the expressions for the components  of the optical momentum results

The optical Hamiltonian is chosen as

although other choices could be made. The Hamilton's equations with k = 1, 2, 3 defined above together with  define the possible light rays.

Generalized coordinates

As in Hamiltonian mechanics, it is also possible to write the equations of Hamiltonian optics in terms of generalized coordinates , generalized momenta  and Hamiltonian P as

where the optical momentum is given by

A particular case is obtained when these vectors form an orthonormal basis, that is, they are all perpendicular to each other. In that case,  is the cosine of the angle the optical momentum  makes to unit vector .

See also
 
 Hamiltonian mechanics
 Calculus of variations

References

Geometrical optics